Operator Dead... Post Abandoned is the sixth studio album by Burning Star Core, released on April 17, 2007 by No Quarter Records.

Track listing

Personnel
Adapted from the Operator Dead... Post Abandoned liner notes.
Musicians
 Robery Beatty – electronics
 Mike Shiflet – electronics, computer, voice
 C. Spencer Yeh – violin, electronics, trumpet, voice
 Trevor Tremaine – drums, percussion
Production and additional personnel
 Alan Douches – mastering
 Paul Romano – cover art, art direction

Release history

References

External links 
 Operator Dead... Post Abandoned at Discogs (list of releases)

2007 albums
Burning Star Core albums
Instrumental albums